The 2008 American Samoa Democratic presidential caucuses took place on February 5, 2008, also known as Super Tuesday.  Caucusing began at 11:00 am local time. The early time ensured that results would be reported that evening in the mainland United States.  Hillary Clinton won the caucus, the smallest of Super Tuesday's nominating contests.

The caucus drew a record turnout for the territory. A record-setting 285 caucus goers, who voted for their candidates at a hotel in the capital, Pago Pago, turned out for the caucus.  The caucus selected six pledged delegates to the 2008 Democratic National Convention; however, each delegate received only half a vote, so the caucus essentially determined the allocation of three delegate votes.  Since the pledged delegates were awarded proportionally, Clinton secured 2 delegates, with the third going to her opponent Barack Obama.

Results 

American Samoa also sent 6 unpledged superdelegates to the national convention; 4 endorsed Senator Clinton while 2 endorsed Senator Obama.

See also
American Samoa Republican caucuses, 2008

References

Democratic caucuses
American Samoa
2008
2008 Super Tuesday